Jim Driscoll (1880–1925) was a Welsh boxer.

Jim Driscoll may also refer to:
Jim Driscoll (American football)
Jim Driscoll (sprinter), American track and field sprinter and 1922 US Champion in the 400-meter dash
Jim Driscoll (baseball) (born 1944), American baseball player
Jim Driscoll (hammer thrower) (born 1965), American hammer thrower

See also
James Driscoll (born 1977), American golfer
James D. Driscoll (1931–2003), Chief Clerk of California Assembly